Raakhee Gulzar (born Rakhee Majumdar on 15 August 1947 and known as Raakhee) is an Indian actress who has appeared in many Hindi films and Bengali films as well. In four decades of acting, she has won three Filmfare Awards and one National Film Award, apart from many other awards. At Filmfare, Raakhee has been nominated 16 times in all (8 times for Best Actress and 8 times for Best Supporting Actress).She debuted in the Bengali film Bodhu Boron in 1967 with Geeta Dutta in the lead role. Her first Hindi film was Jeevan Mrityu in 1970.

Early life
Rakhee was born in a Bengali family at Ranaghat in the Nadia district of West Bengal in the early hours of 15 August 1947, just hours after the independence of India. She received her early education in a local girls' school. Her father had a flourishing shoe business in his native village in East Bengal, modern-day Bangladesh, before the partition of India, and thereafter he settled in West Bengal. While still a teenager, Raakhee had an arranged marriage to Bengali journalist/film director Ajay Biswas, which ended shortly afterwards.

At the start of her film career, she dropped her surname and was mentioned in film credits only as "Rakhee," by which name she attained stardom, but upon marrying lyricist-director, Sampooran Singh Kalra professionally known as Gulzar, she took his pen name as her surname and is credited thereafter as Rakhee Gulzar.

Career
In 1967, the 20-year-old Rakhee acted in her first Bengali film Bodhu Boron, after which she was offered the lead role in Rajshri Productions' Jeevan Mrityu (1970) opposite Dharmendra.

In 1971, Rakhee played a double role opposite Shashi Kapoor in Sharmilee, and also starred in Lal Patthar and Paras; all three films became hits and she established herself as a leading actress of Hindi Cinema. Shehzada (1972) opposite Rajesh Khanna and Aankhon Aankhon Mein (1972) opposite a relative newcomer Rakesh Roshan showcased her comic abilities though their box office performance was unsatisfactory. She continued to display versatility even in relatively small roles in Lal Patthar, Heera Panna (1973) and Daag: A Poem of Love (1973), with her strong performances. The phenomenal success of Rajshri Productions' Tapasya (1976) a heroine-dominated movie where she played the sacrificing sister opposite Parikshit Sahni established her as a box-office name to reckon with.  Rakhee regards her performances in Blackmail (1973), Tapasya (1976) and Aanchal as her best.

She acted with Dev Anand in Heera Panna, Banarasi Babu (1973), Joshila (1973) and Lootmaar (1980). Rakhee starred opposite Shashi Kapoor in 10 released films: Sharmilee, Jaanwar Aur Insaan (1972), Kabhie Kabhie (1976), Doosra Aadmi (1977), the critically acclaimed Trishna (1978), Baseraa (1981), Bandhan Kuchchey Dhaagon Ka (1983), Zameen Aasmaan (1984), and Pighalta Aasman (1985) and the unreleased Ek Do Teen Chaar. Her exemplary chemistry with Amitabh Bachchan was showcased in eight films: Kabhie Kabhie (1976), Muqaddar Ka Sikander (1978), Kasme Vaade (1978), Trishul (1978), Kaala Patthar (1979), Jurmana (1979), Barsaat Ki Ek Raat (1981), and Bemisal (1982). In some films such as Jurmana, her name is even credited ahead of the hero. She also formed a popular pair with Sanjeev Kumar with films like Hamare Tumhare (1979) and Shriman Shrimati (1982).

In 1981, a 23-year-old aspiring director Anil Sharma asked her to star in an out and out female oriented role in his debut film Shradhanjali. After the success of the film Raakhee was flooded by strong heroine-dominated roles. At the peak of her career as a popular heroine, she surprised everyone by accepting strong character roles as sister-in-law to Rajesh Khanna in Aanchal (1980), Shashi Kapoor and Amitabh in Shaan (1980), Mithun Chakraborty in Dhuan, and mother to Amitabh in Shakti (1982) and Rishi Kapoor in Yeh Vaada Raha (1982).

She acted in other Bengali films; Paroma (1984) and was awarded the BFJA Award for Best Actress.

Towards the late 1980s and 1990s she played strong character roles as the elderly mother or a woman of principles in commercially successful films such as Ram Lakhan (1989), Anari (1993), Baazigar (1993), Khalnayak (1993), Karan Arjun (1995), Border (1997), Soldier (1998), Ek Rishtaa: The Bond of Love (2001) and Dil Ka Rishta (2002).

In 2003 she appeared in Rituparno Ghosh directed film Shubho Mahurat for which she won the National Film Award for Best Supporting Actress.

In one of her interviews, she said in 2012 that her favourite heroes were Rajesh Khanna and Shashi Kapoor.

In 2019 Kolkata International Film Festival the film Nirbon directed by Goutam Halder was premiered, where Rakhee portrayed the role of Bijolibala, a seventy years old lady with a strong conviction. "Doing films is not on my agenda right now, but the story fascinated me" Rakhee said about the adaptation of Moti Nandi's novel Bijolibalar Mukti.

Rakhee Gulzar has diverse experiences in a wide range of activities she has been associated with in the film industry. In many occasions she extended her contributions beyond acting and delved into various other field of activities, some of which are listed below:
1998 – Pyaar To Hona Hi Tha – Costume Designer1999 – Dil Kya Kare – Dress Assistant. In 1982 she lent her voice for the film Taaqat in the song Teri nindiya ko lag jaye aag re sung in duet with Kishore Kumar.

Personal life
In her second marriage, Raakhee married film director, poet and lyricist Gulzar. The couple have a daughter, Meghna Gulzar. When their daughter was only one year old, they separated. After completing her graduation in films from New York University, Meghna went on to become a director of films including Filhaal..., Just Married and Dus Kahaniyaan, and authored a biography of her father in 2004.

At one point, Raakhee stayed in her bungalow, "Muktangan" (bought from the Marathi playwright P. L. Deshpande), on Sarojini Road in Khar, Mumbai. Later, she sold the property and moved to an apartment two buildings away, though the new high rise is still called by the same name, as she had wished.  she mostly stays in the Panvel farmhouse on the Mumbai outskirts.

"My mother has lived her professional and personal life with tremendous dignity and grace". said Meghna Gulzar, daughter of Rakhee, in an interview. Presently she lives in recluse in her farmhouse at Panvel, spending time in tending to a huge flock of animals, growing vegetables and reading books.

Awards and nominations

Won
1973 – Filmfare Award for Best Supporting Actress for Daag: A Poem of Love
1973 – BFJA Award, Best Supporting Actress (Hindi) for Daag: A Poem of Love
1974 – National Film Award, special souvenir for her role in 27 Down.
1976 – Filmfare Award for Best Actress for Tapasya
1984 – BFJA Award, Best Actress for Paroma
1989 – Filmfare Award for Best Supporting Actress for Ram Lakhan
2003 – National Film Award for Best Supporting Actress for the Bengali film Shubho Mahurat
2003 – Padma Shri Award

Nominated
1972 – Filmfare Nomination as Best Actress for Aankhon Aankhon Mein
1976 – Filmfare Nomination as Best Actress for Kabhie Kabhie
1977 – Filmfare Nomination as Best Actress for Doosra Aadmi
1977 – Filmfare Nomination as Best Supporting Actress for Doosra Aadmi
1978 – Filmfare Nomination as Best Actress for Trishna
1979 – Filmfare Nomination as Best Actress for Jurmana
1981 – Filmfare Nomination as Best Actress for Baseraa
1983 – Filmfare Nomination as Best Actress for Shakti
1985 – Filmfare Nomination as Best Supporting Actress for Saaheb
1993 – Filmfare Nomination as Best Supporting Actress for Anari
1995 – Filmfare Nomination as Best Supporting Actress for Karan Arjun
1997 – Filmfare Nomination as Best Supporting Actress for Border
1998 – Filmfare Nomination as Best Supporting Actress for Soldier

Filmography

References

External links 

Indian film actresses
Recipients of the Padma Shri in arts
1947 births
Living people
Best Supporting Actress National Film Award winners
Actresses in Bengali cinema
Actresses in Hindi cinema
People from Nadia district
Filmfare Awards winners